Peter Michel (born 14 October 1938) is a German art scholar, publicist and exhibition organizer.

Life 
Born in Freyburg (Unstrut), Michel comes from a craftsman family. From 1959 to 1964 he was a teacher at the secondary school . Afterwards he worked in the district administration Annaberg and in the district administration Karl-Marx-Stadt of Free German Youth.

A year later, a controversy followed with politician  about the contemporary nature of the term "Socialist Realism".
 
From 1979 to 1991 he was a member of the International Association of Art Critics. At the end of 1989 he resigned from the VBK and from the Socialist Unity Party of Germany (SED/PDS). From 1991 until 2003 he worked as a freelancer for pb-Verlag Munich, exhibition organizer and freelance journalist. Michel had working stays in 19 European and non-European countries. Since 1990 he has focused his attention on a respectful treatment of art created in the German Democratic Republic. In 1995 he handed over a collection of texts for archiving and research to the Art Research Center in the Getty Center. In 1991 Michel became a founding member of the association  (GBM) and member of the federal board of the GBM. He was speaker of the GBM's "Culture" working group and a founding member of the "Art from the GDR" circle of friends. From 2004 to 2008 and in 2012 he took over as editor-in-chief of the magazine ICARUS of the GBM, which was discontinued in the same year.

Publications and exhibitions

Own book publications 
 Die Staffelei im Hühnerhof, Der Kinderbuchverlag Berlin (2 editions 1981,1982)
 Buchbilder.  und seine Illustrationen, performed by Michel, Der Kinderbuchverlag Berlin 1989
 Ankunft in der Freiheit. Essays gegen den Werteverlust der Zeit, Verlag am Park, Berlin 2011
 Kulturnation Deutschland? Streitschrift wider die modernen Vandalen, with documentary picture section; Verlag Wiljo Heinen, Berlin and Böklund 2013, 
 Künstler in der Zeitenwende I. Biografische Miniaturen und ein Prolog von , Verlag Wiljo Heinen, Berlin und Böklund 2016, 
 Künstler in der Zeitenwende II. Biografische Miniaturen und ein Prolog von , Verlag Wiljo Heinen, Berlin und Böklund 2018, 
 Gewissenstrommler. Essays zur bildenden Kunst 1994–2018,  Verlag Wiljo Heinen, Berlin and Böklund, 2018, .

List of publications.

Contributions in other book publications and catalogues 
 Mythos und Ethos. Essay für die Monographie  – Zeichnungen, Malerei, Graphik, Texte, ed. by Angelika Haas and Bernd Kuhnert, ARTE-MISIA-PRESS Berlin 2004
 Lexikon Künstler in der DDR, ed. by Dietmar Eisold, Verlag Neues Leben Berlin 2010, Leitung der Redaktionsgruppe
 Text für den Katalog "Gudrun Brüne – Lebensspuren" des Museums am Dom Würzburg, ed. by Michael Koller and Jürgen Lenssen, o. J.
 Mit Kopf und Herz, text for the catalog  – It’s about time…" on the occasion of his personal exhibition at the Forum ALTE POST in Pirmasens 2017

Articles in the German press 
 Die Naiven – Verklärung und Realität, Artikelfolge in der Zeitschrift „Bildnerisches Volksschaffen“, issues 2 to 5/1974
 20 Jahre Kultur-Vandalismus. DDR-Kunst soll als "ein hässlicher Regentropfen der Geschichte rasch verdunsten", in special isssue of the Deutsche Geschichte: 20 Jahre deutsch-deutsches Dilemma – eine alternativlos ehrliche Bilanz, Einheit in Zwietracht, issue 1/2010

Articles in foreign newspapers and magazines 
 Kammerton der Bildhauerkunst. Bemerkungen zur Ausstellung „Kleinplastik und Graphik aus der DDR“ in Moskau, in Sowjetliteratur (deutschsprachige Ausgabe, Moskau), Heft 11/1976
 Kathedrale eines Zeitalters. Zum Panorama-Gemälde Werner Tübkes in Bad Frankenhausen, in Vytvarny Zivot (Bratislava), issue 3/1987; Müvészet (Budapest), issue 11–12/1986; Iskusstvo (Sofia), issue 8/1986; Tvortschestvo (Moskau), issue 9/1986; arta (Bukarest), issue 1/1987

Articles in the newspaper Marxistische Blätter 
 Fünf Schwierigkeiten im Umgang mit der Kunst Willi Sittes, issue 4/1994
 Schreiben über die Kunstgeschichte der DDR oder Anatomie eines Glaubenswechsels, issue 1 and 2/2001

Articles in the newspaper Icarus 
 Häftlingsnummer B 3936. Der arge Weg s, issue 2/2005
 Die Verhältnisse durchschaubar machen. Laudatio zur Verleihung des Menschenrechtspreises des Vereins GBM an Heidrun Hegewald, Willi Sitte and Walter Womacka, issue 1/2010
 Verbrechen an der deutschen Kultur. Gedanken zum 75. Jahrestag der Eröffnung der Ausstellung Entartete Kunst in München, issue 3–4/2012

Articles in the daily junge Welt 
 Nachdenken in einem beseitigten Mahnmal. Heidrun Hegewald gewidmet, 20 October 2006
 Er ist hier bei uns. Gedanken zum 130. Geburtstag von Pablo Picasso, 25 October 2011
 Theatrum mundi. 14. September 1989: Einweihung des Panoramabildes „Frühbürgerliche Revolution in Deutschland“ von Werner Tübke in Bad Frankenhausen, 13./14 September 2014
 Dialektischer Realismus. Grundbegriff für eine Kunstgeschichte der DDR. Zum Tod des Kunsthistorikers Peter H. Feist, 4 August 2015
 Ein eigenes Urteil bilden. Das Potsdamer Museum Barberini zeigt Kunst aus der DDR – darunter zahlreiche Bilder, die nach 1990 nicht mehr zu sehen waren, 15 November 2017 
 (Further more than 100 contributions for press, radio, television and catalogues; lectures and readings at home and abroad)

Exhibitions 
 Personal exhibition of the Moscow painter Tatjana Nasarenko in the Haus der Bürgerschaft Bremen 1986 (opening speech)
 Der eigene Blick. Berliner Kunstkritiker zeigen Kunst ihrer Wahl im Ephraim Palace Berlin 1988 (participation with own collection, catalogue text)
 Personalausstellung des österreichischen jüdischen Malers Heinrich Sussmann im Prussian Heritage Image Archive Berlin 1989 (Konzeption, Organisation, Eröffnungsrede)
  for his 80th birthday. Exhibition in the Klostergalerie Zehdenick 2014 (opening speech)
 Four lives. Two pairs of artists in the Armenian tradition. Exhibition at the Kulturhaus Berlin-Karlshorst 2016 (co-curator, catalogue author, statement on the opening)
 Participation in further numerous exhibitions in Freudenstadt, Wittlich, Seeheim-Jugenheim, Neu-Ulm, in the GBM-Gallery and other Berlin galleries, in Kuopio (Finland), in the Art Gallery Gera, the Protestant Academy Meissen, the Municipal Gallery Eisenhüttenstadt, in the Art Association Templin and others

Participation in juries 
 100 selected graphics, 100 best posters, selection committee painting and graphics of the X.

Literature 
 Anke Scharnhorst: Michel, Peter in  5th edition. BVolume 2, Ch. Links, Berlin 2010, .

Awards and honours 
 1983 
 1984 Banner of Labor 
 Human Rights Award of the Society for the Protection of Civil Rights and Human Dignity 2015 The laudatory speech was held by the painter and graphic artist .

References

External links 
 

Art writers
Socialist Unity Party of Germany members
1938 births
Living people
People from Freyburg, Germany